is a Japanese politician of the Democratic Party of Japan, a member of the House of Councillors in the Diet (national legislature). A native of Sendai, Miyagi, he graduated from Rikkyo University and attended Whitworth University in Washington, United States. After having served in the House of Representatives for five terms, he lost his seat in 1996 as a member of the New Frontier Party. He was re-elected in 2000 but lost the seat again in 2003. In 2004 he ran for the House of Councillors and was elected for the first time.

References 
 

1945 births
Living people
People from Sendai
Whitworth University alumni
Members of the House of Representatives (Japan)
Members of the House of Councillors (Japan)
New Frontier Party (Japan) politicians
20th-century Japanese politicians
Democratic Party of Japan politicians
Rikkyo University alumni